The Square was a 250 capacity independent live music venue in Harlow, Essex, England. It was managed by SquareOne Entertainment LLP who took over the venue in July 2008. After a five-month closure period from the end of 2015, The Square re-opened on Friday, 10 June 2016 before closing permanently in early 2017.

Prior to 2008 it was run by Essex County Council until funding was withdrawn and the venue was closed after over 35 years of service as a community resource.

The Square was one of the starting places for acts including Enter Shikari, George Ezra, and The Subways. Harlow bands Collapsed Lung and Morning Parade formed at the venue. Cornershop name the venue as the gig that got them signed, as well as being the first venue to pay them to play. BBC DJ Steve Lamacq broadcast a live Coldplay show from the venue in 2000.

The Square comedy club played host to Jack Dee, Eddie Izzard, Jo Brand, Phill Jupitus, Terry Alderton and was regularly hosted by John Mann.

In 2012, a live recording by the band Seymour (later Blur) from 1989 was included in the Blur 21 box set.  

In May 2015, building owners Circle Housing announced plans for redevelopment of the site.

In July 2015, a series of gigs under the banner 'Back To Square One' was announced, with big-name acts coming back to play the venue one last time. The series includes Newtown Neurotics, The Members, Steve Harris British Lion, Buzzcocks, DragonForce, InMe, King Prawn, Attila The Stockbroker, The Beat, Nine Below Zero, Collapsed Lung, Gaz Coombes, Chas & Dave, and Secret Affair.

In October 2015, The Square was shortlisted for NME magazine's 'Britain's Best Small Venue' competition.

The Square finally closed on the morning of 31 January 2017, with one of the final bands playing the venue being Bristol's long standing band The Blue Aeroplanes on their 2017 UK tour. It was later demolished.

References

External links
The Square official website

Music venues in Essex
Harlow
Former music venues in England